Ferris House may refer to:

United States
Listed by state, then city:
Samuel Ferris House, Greenwich, Connecticut
John Ferris House, Washington, Connecticut
Zachariah Ferris House, Wilmington, Delaware
Edward Ferris House, a Michigan State Historic Site in Ingham County
Sears–Ferris House, Carson City, Nevada
Ferris House (New York), Ticonderoga, New York
Joseph Ferris House, Cincinnati, Ohio
Eliphalet Ferris House, Mariemont, Ohio
Ferris House (Pittsburgh), Pittsburgh, Pennsylvania
James W. Ferris House, listed on the NRHP in Codington County, South Dakota